The Chicago, Milwaukee & St. Paul Depot-Jefferson, also known simply as the Milwaukee Depot is an historic building located in Jefferson, Iowa, United States. The rail line that this station served was built by the Wabash, St. Louis and Pacific Railway in either 1882 or 1883. Known as the High Bridge Route because of the height of the bridge over the Des Moines River, it was acquired by the Des Moines, Northern and Western Railroad in 1891. Four years later the Chicago, Milwaukee and St. Paul Railway acquired the line. The Milwaukee Road built this train station from their standard building plan between 1906 and 1909. It is almost identical to the station built in 1906 in Adel, Iowa. This passenger station replaced a combination passenger and freight depot that was moved and used solely as a freight depot. The Milwaukee Road discontinued passenger service in Jefferson in the early 1950s, and the depot continued as a freight office until 1980. The building was listed on the National Register of Historic Places in 1994.

References

 

Railway stations in the United States opened in 1906
Railway stations closed in 1980
Jefferson, Iowa
Transportation buildings and structures in Greene County, Iowa
Railway stations on the National Register of Historic Places in Iowa
Former railway stations in Iowa
Jefferson
National Register of Historic Places in Greene County, Iowa